Calyciphora xanthodactyla is a moth of the family Pterophoridae. It is found in Slovakia, Hungary, Romania, Bulgaria and North Macedonia. It has also been recorded from Morocco and Turkey.

The larvae feed on Jurinea mollis and Carlina biebersteinii. They can be found from May to June.

References

Pterophorini
Moths described in 1833
Moths of Asia
Plume moths of Africa
Plume moths of Europe
Taxa named by Georg Friedrich Treitschke